Juhi Babbar is an Indian film and television actress. She has also contributed to theatre both as an actor and director. She is the daughter of famous Bollywood actor Raj Babbar and the second wife of Indian TV actor and anchor Anup Soni.

Personal life

Juhi's first husband was Bejoy Nambiar, a screenplay writer, whom she married on 27 June 2007. The couple divorced in January 2009. She then fell in love with the TV actor Anup Soni, whom she met while both of them were working in a play produced by Juhi's mother Nadira Babbar. Soni was at that time married to Ritu and was the father of two daughters by her. On 14 March 2011, after his divorce was finalized, Juhi and Anup Soni were married. Juhi and Soni have a son, born in 2012.

Career
Juhi made her film debut in Kash Aap Hamare Hote opposite Sonu Nigam. In 2005, she did a Punjabi film with Jimmy Shergill, Yaara Naal Baharan. The film did well in Punjab and with the overseas Punjabi audience. Juhi then did a silent film with Malayalam actor Mohanlal. In 2006, she was seen in the film Unns with actor Sanjay Kapoor and Rituparna Sengupta. She appeared in her next film It's My Life as Sonia Jaisingh opposite actors Harman Baweja, Genelia D'Souza and Nana Patekar. In 2009, Juhi played the role of a house wife in the TV comedy Ghar Ki Baat Hai produced by Shah Rukh Khan.

Filmography

Television

Theatre

Actor

Director

Awards

References

External links
 

Living people
Year of birth missing (living people)
Place of birth missing (living people)
Actresses from Lucknow
Indian film actresses
Actresses in Hindi cinema
21st-century Indian actresses